Seh Daran or Seh Deran may refer to:
 Seh Daran, Bam, a village in Deh Bakri Rural District, in the Central District of Bam County, Kerman Province, Iran
 Seh Deran, Jiroft, a village in Sarduiyeh Rural District, Sarduiyeh District, Jiroft County, Kerman Province, Iran